Kołacin may refer to the following places in Poland:
Kołacin, Pomeranian Voivodeship (north Poland)
Kołacin, Łódź Voivodeship (central Poland)
Kołacin, Greater Poland Voivodeship (west-central Poland)